Neela Malargal is a 1979 Indian Tamil-language film, directed by Krishnan–Panju. The film stars Kamal Haasan, Sridevi and Major Sundarrajan. It is a remake of the Hindi film Anuraag (1972). The film was released on 19 October 1979.

Plot

Cast 
 Kamal Haasan as Doctor Chandiran
 Sridevi as Meena
 Major Sundarrajan as Ponnambalam
 K. R. Vijaya as Santhi
 Thengai Srinivasan as Kathavarayan pillai
 Sukumari as Kamatchi
 Nagesh as Parthasarathy
 Malashri as Master Kannan

Soundtrack 
The music was composed by M. S. Viswanathan. All songs are written by Kannadasan. The song "Pesum Manimottu Rojakkal" is based on the Mary Poppins song "Chim Chim Cher-ee".

References

External links 
 

1970s Tamil-language films
1979 films
Films directed by Krishnan–Panju
Films scored by M. S. Viswanathan
Tamil remakes of Hindi films